is a Japanese band formed in 2012. Consisting of lead vocalist and pianist Yuko Suzuhana, shakuhachi player Daisuke Kaminaga, and koto player Kiyoshi Ibukuro, the trio became the basis for the fusion metal band Wagakki Band.

History
In 2011, Shigin singer Yuko Suzuhana,who had been elected Miss Nico Nama ニコ生 in 2011, recruited Kiyoshi Ibukuro and Daisuke Kaminaga on Twitter to perform on the Nico Nico Chōkaigi stage the following year. In February 2012, the trio debuted as Hanafugetsu. The name was derived from the image of each member: Suzuhana = , Kaminaga = , Ibukuro = .

Members
  – lead vocals, piano
  – shakuhachi
  – koto

Discography

Studio albums

Mini-albums

Singles

See also
Wagakki Band

References

External links 

 
 
 
 Hanafugetsu at Oricon

Wagakki Band
Japanese musical groups
2012 establishments in Japan
Musical groups established in 2012
Musical trios